Fandom (stylized in all caps) is the third studio album by American pop rock band Waterparks, released on October 11, 2019. It is the band's only release through Hopeless Records and was produced by Zakk Cervini. The album debuted at number 32 on the Billboard 200 and number 52 in the UK, spawning six singles: "Turbulent", "Watch What Happens Next", "Dream Boy", "[Reboot]", "High Definition" and "Easy to Hate".

Background
Fandom was originally going to be titled Friendly Reminder, but lead vocalist Awsten Knight decided to delete the files and start over. In speaking about why he deleted the album and started over, Knight stated:

Themes and composition
Musically, Fandom has been described as pop, pop rock, pop punk, electropop, electronic, emo pop, and rock, with elements of hip hop, synth-pop, emo, emo rap, alternative pop, drum and bass, and acoustic rock. Lyrically, the album focuses on fan expectations and pressure. Talking about the album's themes, Wall of Sound stated, "[the album] goes through stages of having written about the fandom directly and the pressures of being looked up to and the issues that have been noticed...to being about a very hard breakup and mental health struggles that comes with everything in general, as well as the topics being spoken about."

Release
On May 23, 2019, the band released their first single off of their upcoming album, "Turbulent" and announced that they got signed to Hopeless Records. On August 12, 2019, the band released the second single, "Watch What Happens Next" along with a music video and the announcement of the album to be released on October 11, 2019. On August 16, 2019, the band released their third single, "Dream Boy," along with a music video. On September 12, 2019, the fourth single, "[Reboot]" was released. On September 25, 2019, they released their fifth single for the album, "High Definition," along with a music video. On October 17, 2019, "Easy to Hate" was released as the sixth single, along with a music video.

Artwork
The artwork for the album features a sliced orange in front of a dark green tiled ledge. It was conceptualized and drafted by Knight before being finalized by illustrator Amber Park.

Reception

Fandom received critical acclaim. In his review, Jack Rogers of Rock Sound called the album "one of the year's most fascinating, ferocious and fanatical albums". Jamie MacMillan of Dork gave the album four stars out of five, describing it as "edgy, exciting, and another nail in the coffin of boring genre restraints", calling it the band's best work to date. Jo Cosgrove of Discovered Magazine gave the album a rating of 9.5/10, stating that "Fandom is a very fun, very bouncy, party-perfect album. But to the right listeners, a fifteen-track confession on why fame and celebrity isn’t as fun as it looks. Or sounds."

Track listing

Personnel
Credits for Fandom

Waterparks
 Awsten Knight – lead vocals, guitar, bass, additional programming, artwork, layout
 Geoff Wigington – guitar, vocals
 Otto Wood – drums, vocals

Additional
 De'wayne Jackson – vocals
 Lucy Landry – vocals

Production
 Zakk Cervini – producer, engineer, mastering, mixing
 Amber Park – artwork, layout
 Jared Poythress – programming
 Nik Tretiakov – editing

Charts

References

2019 albums
Waterparks (band) albums
Hopeless Records albums